Ride Lonesome is a 1959 American CinemaScope Western film directed by Budd Boetticher and starring Randolph Scott, Karen Steele, Pernell Roberts, Lee Van Cleef, and James Coburn in his film debut. This Eastmancolor film is one of Boetticher's so-called "Ranown cycle" of westerns, made with Randolph Scott, executive producer Harry Joe Brown and screenwriter Burt Kennedy, beginning with Seven Men from Now.

Plot
Bounty hunter Ben Brigade captures Billy John, who is wanted for murder, to bring to Santa Cruz. Billy instructs Charlie, a member of his gang, to notify his brother Frank, a notorious outlaw, that he has been apprehended. Along the trail, they come upon an eerily deserted stagecoach way station, where they are greeted by outlaw Sam Boone and his partner Whit. Carrie Lane, the absent station master's wife, emerges holding a rifle and orders the men to leave. As a stagecoach approaches in the distance, Brigade suspects that Boone and Whit have come to rob the coach, which then crashes into the corral, revealing that the driver and passengers have been massacred by Mescalero Indians.

After burying the dead, Brigade and the others hole up at the station, waiting for the Indians to attack. When Carrie, whose husband left to round up some horses scattered by the Indians, voices her concern about him, Brigade snorts that he was a fool to leave her. Boone tells Brigade that he and Whit did not plan to rob the stage, but to capture Billy and earn the award of amnesty for all past crimes. In the morning, Brigade orders Carrie to ride with them to pick up her husband. A band of Indians appears on the horizon and Brigade rides out to meet the chief, who wants Carrie for his squaw and offers to trade a horse for her. Insisting that they play along, Brigade presents Carrie, who recognizes the horse offered in exchange as belonging to her husband and screams, prompting the Indians to ride off.

The group is pursued by the Indians and takes cover at an adobe shack over the rise. When the chief comes for Carrie, she kills him with her rifle, and the remaining Indians disperse. In the morning, Billy holds a stolen rifle of Boone's on Brigade but is tricked into relinquishing it when Boone tells him that it is unloaded. Boone begins to believe that the bounty hunter wants Frank to catch up to them. Nervous about an armed confrontation with Frank, Whit suggests ceding Billy to Brigade and riding off, but Boone insists on staying. Boone offers to pay Brigade the price on Billy's head if he will hand over the outlaw, but Brigade refuses. Upon reaching the shack, Frank is puzzled that Brigade has not bothered to conceal his tracks and finally realizes that Brigade wants him to catch up so that he can avenge a past offense.

As Brigade and the others pass a hanging tree, Brigade becomes irritable and orders them to camp a day's ride from Santa Cruz. Boone tells Carrie that he will look out for her and warns her that Brigade will never reach town alive. Carrie voices her disgust over killing for money, and Brigade confides that his real target is Frank. When Brigade was sheriff of Santa Cruz, he arrested Frank, who after being released from jail kidnapped Brigade's wife and hanged her from the tree.

Frank's gang arrives. Having overheard the story of his wife's murder, Boone offers to cover Brigade in his confrontation. Brigade orders Billy to mount his horse, slips a noose around Billy's neck, leads him to the hanging tree, and challenges Frank to stop the hanging. Frank opens fire, causing Billy's horse to bolt and leave Billy swinging from the tree. Brigade kills Frank and shoots the rope hanging Billy from the tree, while Boone and Whit chase off the rest of the gang. Brigade turns Billy over to Boone and warns him to keep his promise about going straight. After the others ride off toward Santa Cruz, Brigade sets the tree on fire.

Cast

Home media
In 2008, a DVD box set of five Budd Boetticher films starring Randolph Scott was released by Sony Columbia. Along with Ride Lonesome  the set includes  Buchanan Rides Alone, Decision at Sundown, Comanche Station, and The Tall T.In 2018, a Region Free Blu-ray set of the same films, many of them restored, was released by Powerhouse films, on the 'Indicator' label. The title was 'Five Tall Tales: Budd Boetticher & Randolph Scott At Columbia, 1957-1960'.

See also
List of American films of 1959

References

External links

1959 films
American Western (genre) films
1959 Western (genre) films
Columbia Pictures films
Films directed by Budd Boetticher
CinemaScope films
Films scored by Heinz Roemheld
1950s English-language films
1950s American films